Forcipomyia bystraki is a species of biting midges (flies in the family Ceratopogonidae) from North America.

References

Further reading

 
 

Ceratopogonidae
Diptera of North America
Insects described in 1975
Articles created by Qbugbot